"Gonna Know We Were Here" is a song written by Brett Beavers and Brett James and recorded by American country music singer Jason Aldean. It was released in August 2015 as the fourth single from Aldean's 2014 album Old Boots, New Dirt.

Critical reception
An uncredited Taste of Country review stated that "Jason Aldean is in the business of turning out radio hits, and “Gonna Know We Were Here” doesn’t disobey. The uptempo country-rocker stays true to the singer’s well-tested formula. It’s a song his fans will want to turn up loud, quickly."

Music video
The music video was directed by Shaun Silva and premiered in October 2015.

Chart performance
"Gonna Know We Were Here" peaked at number 2 on the Billboard Country Airplay chart and number 5 on the Billboard Hot Country Songs chart, making it Aldean's tenth single to miss the number one spot on either chart. It has sold 204,000 copies in the US as of January 2016.

Year-end charts

References

2014 songs
2015 singles
Jason Aldean songs
BBR Music Group singles
Songs written by Brett Beavers
Songs written by Brett James
Song recordings produced by Michael Knox (record producer)
Music videos directed by Shaun Silva